Lie with Me is a novel by the French writer Philippe Besson. It was published in 2017 and received critical acclaim. It won the Maison de la Presse Prize. It was translated into English by Molly Ringwald under the title Lie with Me and was lauded by English-language reviewers.

Set in 1984 in rural France, in the small town of Barbezieux, the novel recounts the teenage love affair between the narrator and his schoolmate Thomas Andrieu.

Besson, in a piece published in January, 2020, writes about the significance to him of the novel The Lover by Marguerite Duras.

References

2017 French novels
Novels set in France
Éditions Julliard books
Autofiction